El Tozu is one of ten parishes (administrative divisions) in Caso, a municipality within the province and autonomous community of Asturias, in northern Spain. 

The population is 75 (INE 2006).

Villages 
 El Tozu
 Cabañaderecha

References 

Parishes in Caso